VIPR can refer to:

Volumetric Imaging and Processing of Integrated Radar
Virus Pathogen Database and Analysis Resource (ViPR), a publicly available database and analysis resource for viral pathogens in the U.S
Visible Intermodal Prevention and Response team (TSA program in the US)
VIPR1, a G protein-coupled receptor
EMC ViPR, a software-defined storage offering
Vastly undersampled Isotropic Projection Reconstruction of Phase contrast magnetic resonance imaging
Vasoactive intestinal peptide receptor